Blik, a payment system in Poland

It may also be:

BLIK, a former futsal club from Nefteyugansk, Russia
Blik (magazine), Belgian Flemish language gossip magazine about showbiz and television news, with extra attention to scandals
Maurice Blik (born 1939), British sculptor and past President of the Royal British Society of Sculptors
Mr. Blik, a main character in the American animated television series Catscratch

Other uses
BlikBook, an online platform used in higher education to enable improved student engagement
Oog & Blik, Dutch publisher of comics
A philosophical concept developed by R. M. Hare to respond to the problem of religious language